Mexborough engine shed was an engine shed in Swinton, in South Yorkshire, England. It was built by the Great Central Railway and opened in 1875. The shed was built slightly to the west of the current Mexborough station on land between the River Don and the River Don Navigation. It had 15 dead end roads, and could handle about 150 steam locomotives, mainly for use on freight trains. The London and North Eastern Railway operated the shed from 1923.  In 1948, on the formation of British Railways Eastern Region, Mexborough bore the shed code 36B, then 41F from 1958. It closed in February 1964.
 
Most of the locomotives stabled at Mexborough were used for hauling coal trains.  The coal originated from the many collieries in the South Yorkshire coalfield and wagons of coal were despatched to locations all over the country.  However, the main destinations were the industries and power stations in Lancashire.  With the opening of the Wath marshalling yard in 1907, Mexborough supplied locomotives for collecting wagons from the collieries, for re-marshalling of the wagons at Wath and for hauling coal trains across the steeply-graded "Woodhead" route across the Pennines into Lancashire.  In the 1920s, the depot was the stabling point for what was then the most powerful locomotive in the UK, the London & North Eastern Railway's Class U1 Garratt.  It was used for banking heavy coal trains up the Worsborough incline on the Woodhead route.

In 1942 during the Second World War, three former Great Eastern Railway LNER J15 locomotives were drafted into to assist with coal traffic.

In the 1950s, the route from Wath to Manchester was electrified.  Consequently, the demand for the steam locomotives from the Mexborough depot reduced.  The electric locomotives were stabled at Wath rather than Mexborough.  Even the steam shunting engines for the marshalling work at Wath yard were replaced by diesel shunters in 1957.  The use of steam locomotives for collecting coal from local collieries was also phased out and the depot closed in 1964. The site of Mexborough  depot is now occupied by units in an industrial estate off of Meadow Way in Swinton.
In its heyday, the depot had its own football team, Mexborough Locomotive Works F.C.

Locomotives
On 1 January 1923 the following classes of locomotive were allocated to Mexborough.

In 1950, locomotive classes allocated to Mexborough included:
 LNER Thompson Class B1 4-6-0
 LNER Class O2 2-8-0
 LNER Class J11 0-6-0
 LNER Class J50 0-6-0T
 LNER Class N5 0-6-2T 
 WD Austerity 2-8-0

References
Notes

Bibliography

Railway depots in Yorkshire
Mexborough